From the Mind of Lil Louis is the debut album by the American house musician Lil Louis, released in 1989.

The single "French Kiss" peaked at No. 50 on the Billboard Hot 100; it peaked at No. 2 on the UK Singles Chart.

Production
The album's tracks were written and produced by Lil Louis; he also played most of the instruments. The album sides are titled "Dance" and "Romance", with the song "Insecure" composed as a ballad. Lil Louis's father, who had played as a sideman with Bobby Bland and B.B. King, sings and plays guitar on "Lil Tanya". Larry Heard aka Mr. Fingers contributed production work to the album.

Critical reception

The New York Times thought that Lil Louis "has created a breakthrough album for house music by turning a genre usually heard amid the public revelry of the dance floor into a private, interior playground." The Globe and Mail wrote that the album is "a wonderfully eclectic blend of street vocals, soulful riffs and top-rate instrumental work." The St. Petersburg Times deemed the album "a bold debut," writing that "the sound is of spare, brooding jazz, uniquely subdued and shot through with Louis' smoldering sexuality ... The music's sensual appeal is awesome, as physically in tune with the times as Prince ever was." The Calgary Herald declared that "when a new artist cops tricks from Prince, George Clinton and Laurie Anderson, you know he's on the right track."

AllMusic called the album "a triumph," writing that "Larry Heard's input on tracks like 'Blackout', 'Tuch Me' and '6 A.M.' is stellar." Listing From the Mind of Lil Louis as an "Essential" album of house music, Spin praised the "propulsive" and "pastoral" conceptual sides. Mixmag included "French Kiss" on its list of "30 of the Best Chicago House Tracks," and wrote that "I Called U" and "Nyce & Slo" were also "unmissable."

Track listing

Personnel
Lil Louis - production, instrumentation
Larry Heard - production

References

1989 albums
Epic Records albums